Klyn is commonly used to refer to various territories historically inhabited by large numbers of Ukrainian people within the modern day Russia.

Klyn may refer to:
Zeleny Klyn or Green Ukraine, a territory in the Russian Far East
Grey Ukraine or Siryi Klyn, a territory in the Siberia and Northern Kazakhstan
Yellow Ukraine or Zhovty Klyn, a territory centered on the middle and lower Volga river
Raspberry Ukraine or Malynovyi Klyn, known as the Kuban, a territory in the northwest Caucasus that was majority Ukrainian until the Holodomor and Russification of local Ukrainians

See also

Ukrainian diaspora
Ukrainians in Russia
Ukrainians in Siberia
Ukrainians in Kuban

Ukrainian diaspora